The Battle of Fort Bisland was fought in the American Civil War between Union Major General Nathaniel P. Banks against Confederate Major General Richard Taylor during Banks' operations against the Bayou Teche region in southern Louisiana.

Prelude
When Banks was made commander of the XIX Army Corps, Department of the Gulf, on December 16, 1862, he was ordered to coordinate an attack against the Confederate bastion of Port Hudson while General Ulysses S. Grant moved against Vicksburg. Banks made preparations for this campaign, but he knew the difficulties he would face on the march there. First, the area from New Orleans, was marshy, full of swamps, and disease would be rampant. There was also another obstacle in Bank's path — General Richard Taylor's small Army of Western Louisiana.

Banks formulated a plan that would take the XIX Corps to Alexandria, securing the Bayou Teche region that was laden with natural forage and unused supplies. He would establish supply depots along the way and then would move from Alexandria against Port Hudson. However, the quick movement he hoped for was slowed by Taylor's small army in a series of attacks, beginning with Fort Bisland, located in St. Mary Parish, Louisiana.

Battle

When Banks departed New Orleans, he planned to capture Taylor's army in its entirety.  On April 9, two divisions from the XIX Corps crossed Berwick Bay from Brashear City (present day Morgan City, Louisiana) to the west side at Berwick. On April 11, Banks began his advance in earnest. Taylor was well aware of Banks' advance because of successful scouting by his cavalry under Brig. Gen. Thomas Green. Green shadowed Banks' army and reported back to Taylor every detail of the maneuvers of the Union army.

On April 12, Banks sent a third division, under Brig. Gen. Cuvier Grover, up the Atchafalaya River to land in the rear of Franklin, intending to intercept a Confederate retreat from Fort Bisland or turn the enemy's position. General Taylor sent some of Green's cavalry to the front to ascertain the enemy's strength and slow his advance. He also sent troops under Brig. Gen. Alfred Mouton to impede the advance of Grover's division. Late in the day, Union troops of Brig. Gen. William H. Emory's division arrived and formed a battle line outside the Fort Bisland's defenses. An artillery barrage ensued from both sides until dark when the Federal troops fell back to camp for the night.

About 9:00 a.m. on April 13, Union forces again advanced on Fort Bisland.  Banks had three brigades under in position south of the Bayou Teche.  The brigades were deployed with Godfrey Weitzel on the left, Halbert E. Paine on the right (anchored on Bayou Teche) with Timothy Ingraham in support.  Opposing the Union forces south of the Teche was the Texas cavalry brigade commanded by Brig. Gen. Henry Hopkins Sibley.  North of Bayou Teche was the Union brigade of Oliver P. Gooding who faced off against Mouton's Confederate brigade.

Combat did not begin until after 11:00 a.m. and continued until dusk. In addition to Confederate forces in the earthworks, the gunboat Diana, which had been captured and was now in Confederate hands, shelled the Union troops. U.S. gunboats joined the fray in late afternoon.

By early evening, fire had halted. Later that night, Taylor learned that the Union division that went up the Atchafalaya and landed in his rear was now in a position to cut off a Confederate retreat. Taylor began evacuating supplies, men, and weapons, leaving a small force to slow any enemy movement. The next morning, Banks and his men found the fort abandoned.

Aftermath
Fort Bisland was the only fortification that could have impeded this Union offensive, and it had fallen. Banks continued his march up Bayou Teche after this initial battle onward to his ultimate objective of Alexandria, Louisiana.

Taylor would slow Banks again a few days later at the Battle of Irish Bend.

Opposing Forces

Union 
Army of the Gulf – Major General Nathaniel P. Banks

19th Corps – Major General Nathaniel P. Banks
 1st Division -
 2nd Brigade - BG Godfrey Weitzel
 12th Connecticut Infantry Regiment
 75th New York Infantry Regiment (2nd Auburn Regiment)
 114th New York Infantry Regiment (Albany County Regiment, Seymour Guard)
 160th New York Infantry Regiment
 8th Vermont Infantry Regiment
 Attached to 2nd brigade :
 Battery A, 1st United States Artillery Regiment
 6th Massachusetts Light Artillery Battery
 A, B, C, and E Squadrons, 1st Louisiana Cavalry Regiment
 3rd Division - BG William H Emory
 1st Brigade - Col T Ingraham
 4th Massachusetts Infantry Regiment
 16th New Hampshire Infantry Regiment (garrisoned at Brashear city)
 110th New York Infantry Regiment
 162nd New York Infantry Regiment
 2nd Brigade - Col Halbert E Paine
 8th New Hampshire Infantry Regiment
 133rd New York Infantry Regiment (2nd Regiment, Metropolitan Guard)
 173rd New York Infantry Regiment (4th National Guard)
 4th Wisconsin Infantry Regiment
 3rd Brigade - Col O P Gooding
 31st Massachusetts Infantry Regiment
 38th Massachusetts Infantry Regiment
 53rd Massachusetts Infantry Regiment
 156th New York Infantry Regiment (The Mountain Legion)
 175th New York Infantry Regiment
 Divisional Artillery
 1st Maine Light Artillery Battery
 Battery F, 1st United States Artillery Regiment
 19th Corps Artillery - BG Richard Arnold
 1st Indiana Heavy Artillery Regiment
 18th New York Independent Light Artillery Battery

Confederate
District of West Louisiana - Major General Richard Taylor
 Mouton's Brigade - Brig. Gen. Jean Jacques Alfred Alexander Mouton
 18th Louisiana Infantry Regiment - Colonel Armand
 28th Louisiana Infantry Regiment - Colonel Henry Gray
 24th Louisiana Infantry Regiment (Crescent Regiment) - Colonel Bosworth
 10th Louisiana Infantry Bataillon (Yellow Jacket Bataillon) - Lieutenant Colonel Fournet
 12th Louisiana Infantry Bataillon (Clack's Bataillon / Confederate Guard Response Bataillon)
 Pelican Battery - Captain Faries
 Cornay's Battery - Lieutenant Gordy
 Semmes' Battery - Lieutenant Barnes
 Sibley's Brigade - Brig. Gen. Henry Hopkins Sibley
 4th Texas Cavalry Regiment - Colonel James Reily
 5th Texas Cavalry Regiment - Colonel Thomas Green
 7th Texas Cavalry Regiment - Colonel Arthur Bagby
 13th Texas Cavalry Bataillon (Waller's Bataillon)
 Val Verde Texas Battery - Captain Sayer
 Unattached
 2nd Louisiana Cavalry Regiment - Colonel Vincent

References

Sources
 Ayres, Thomas, Dark and Bloody Ground : The Battle of Mansfield and the Forgotten Civil War in Louisiana, Cooper Square Press, 2001.
 Parrish, T. Michael, Richard Taylor, Soldier Prince of Dixie, University of North Carolina Press, 1992.
 Taylor, Richard, Destruction and Reconstruction : Personal experiences of the late war, Time-Life Books, 1983.
 
 

Fort Bisland
Fort Bisland
Fort Bisland
Fort Bisland
St. Mary Parish, Louisiana
1863 in Louisiana
April 1863 events